Ryan Otterson (born November 29, 1986, in Albert Lea, Minnesota) is a former American football offensive tackle. He attended Wyoming University, as a member of the 2010 graduating class. Shortly after the draft ended, Otterson joined the San Diego Chargers as an undrafted free agent.

College career
Otterson redshirted in his freshman year at the University of Wyoming. He served as a backup left tackle in 2006. He took over as the starting left tackle as redshirted sophomore in 2007. He would go on to start every game of his sophomore, junior and senior years at Wyoming.

Professional career
After going undrafted in the 2010 NFL Draft, Otterson signed with the San Diego Chargers as a rookie free agent on May 10, 2010, he was later cut and signed to the practice squad before the regular season. He was waived again in 2011 after re-signing with San Diego, on August 30.

Personal life
Otterson currently works as a World History teacher at Timnath Middle High School in Timnath, Colorado. He also coaches the Timnath High School Football team as the Offensive Line Coach.

References

External links
Wyoming Cowboys football bio
San Diego Chargers bio

1986 births
Living people
American football offensive tackles
Wyoming Cowboys football players
San Diego Chargers players